Du Shanxue (born February 1956) is a former Chinese politician from Shanxi province. He successively served as the Mayor and Chinese Communist Party Secretary of Changzhi, Party Secretary of Lüliang, and Secretary General of the Shanxi Provincial Party Committee, and the province's Vice-Governor. 

Du was removed from office and investigated for corruption in June 2014 along with several of his colleagues, in a precursor to what amounted to a collapse of the political establishment in Shanxi in the face of the party's anti-corruption campaign under Xi Jinping.

Life
Du was born and raised in Lingyi County, Shanxi, where he graduated from Shanxi University of Finance and Economics in 1982, after the resumption of university entrance examination, and received his master of philosophy degree from Shanxi University in 2000. After graduation, he worked at the Shanxi Provincial Government.

Du became involved in politics in June 1976 and joined the Chinese Communist Party (CCP) in March 1975. 

In February 2003, he was appointed the CCP Party Vice-Chief of Changzhi, a month later, he also served as the Mayor of Changzhi, he was promoted to become the CCP Party Chief in February 2008, a position he held until January 2011. Then he was transferred to Lüliang as the CCP Party Chief. 

In January 2012, Du was promoted to become the Secretary General of Shanxi Provincial Party Committee.  One year later, he was elected by the 12th Shanxi People's Congress as the Vice-Governor of Shanxi.

Downfall
On June 19, 2014, Du was being investigated by the Central Commission for Discipline Inspection for "serious violations of laws and regulations".

On February 13, 2015, Du was expelled from the CCP. His alleged crimes have also been transferred to prosecutors for further review. 

On August 30, 2016, he stood trial for taking bribes, offering bribes and huge amount of property with unknown sources at the Intermediate People's Court of Xuzhou in east China's Jiangsu province. Du was sentenced to life sentence on December 20, 2016. He was also deprived of his political rights for life.

Personal life 
Du married Hao Suzhen, who was deputy party branch secretary and deputy director of Shanxi Provincial Audit Department, and was expelled from the CCP and dismissed from public office in August 2015 for taking bribes.

References

1956 births
Chinese Communist Party politicians from Shanxi
People's Republic of China politicians from Shanxi
Living people
Expelled members of the Chinese Communist Party
Vice-governors of Shanxi
Delegates to the 11th National People's Congress
Chinese politicians convicted of corruption
Politicians from Yuncheng